This is a list of lighthouses in Slovenia.

Lighthouses

See also
 Lists of lighthouses and lightvessels

References

External links

  Slovenian Maritime Administration
 

Slovenia
Lighthouses
Lighthouses